Eliza Ault-Connell,  (née Stankovic; born 19 September 1981) is an Australian wheelchair racer, who competed at Paralympic and Olympic Games. She survived meningococcal disease and plays a major role in improving the Australian community's awareness of the disease.

Early life
Eliza Jane Ault-Connell was born in Sydney, New South Wales, on 19 September 1981. In 1997, at the age of 16, she nearly died from meningococcal disease. She had both her legs amputated above the knees two days after contracting the disease. She said "Amputation wasn't a decision I had to make: I was in a coma at the time. Mum and Dad were told that's what had to be done to save my life, so in that sense there was no choice." Later she had to make the decision to have most of the fingers on each hand removed. She was in hospital for six months and in 1998, she acquired prosthetic legs.

She is the Director of Meningococcal Australia and is involved in promoting the awareness of meningococcal disease in the Australian community.

Athletics career
Before her illness, Ault-Connell excelled in netball and basketball. In 1998, she started running using her prosthetic legs and was classed T44 athlete. However, she moved to wheelchair racing as a T54 athlete due to a problem with the bone in the stump.

Ault-Connell's first major international competition was 2002 Commonwealth Games where she won the bronze medal in the Women's Wheelchair 800m. At the 2002 IPC Athletics World Championships, she competed in three events and won a silver medal in the Women's 400m T54 event. At the 2004 Olympic Games, she finished second in the demonstration sport of Women's 1500 m wheelchair and the Women's 800 m wheelchair.  She also participated in the 2004 Summer Paralympics. At the 2004 Athens Paralympics, she competed in five events and did not medal. Ault-Connell won three consecutive Oz Day 10K Wheelchair Road Race from 2004 to 2006. She won a bronze medal in the Women's 800m T54 at the 2006 Commonwealth Games in Melbourne. At the 2006 IPC Athletics World Championships, she competed in three events and won a bronze medal in the Women's 800m T54.

At the 2019 London Marathon which was also the 2019 World Para Athletics Championships marathon event, she finished fourth in the Women's T46. At 2019 World Para Athletics Championships in Dubai, she won the bronze medal in the Women's 800m T54.

She was made a Member of the Order of Australia in the 2019 Queen's Birthday Honours "for significant service to community health, and as a Paralympic athlete."

Ault-Connell competed at the 2020 Tokyo Summer Paralympics, her second Summer Paralympics, In the T54 events she qualified for the finals and came 8th in the 100m and 7th in the 400m. and 13th in the Marathon.

Family 
Ault-Connell was previously married to Gold Medal-winning Australian Paralympic athlete Kieran Ault-Connell and they have two daughters and a son.

Recognition
 NSWIS Ian Thorpe Grand Slam International Outstanding Achievement Award 
 2002 Australian Junior Paralympian of the Year 
 2003 Newcastle Young Citizen of the Year 
 2007 Victorian State Finalist Young Australian of the Year 2007
 2019 Member of the Order of Australia

References

External links 

 Eliza Ault at Athletics Australia
 Eliza Ault-Connell (Stankovic) at Australian Athletics Historical Results
 
 
 
 

1981 births
Olympic wheelchair racers of Australia
Wheelchair racers at the 2004 Summer Olympics
Living people
Australian female wheelchair racers
Paralympic wheelchair racers
Athletes (track and field) at the 2004 Summer Paralympics
Athletes (track and field) at the 2020 Summer Paralympics
Athletes (track and field) at the 2018 Commonwealth Games
Paralympic athletes of Australia
Australian amputees
Wheelchair category Paralympic competitors
Commonwealth Games silver medallists for Australia
Commonwealth Games bronze medallists for Australia
Athletes (track and field) at the 2002 Commonwealth Games
Athletes (track and field) at the 2006 Commonwealth Games
Commonwealth Games medallists in athletics
Members of the Order of Australia
20th-century Australian women
21st-century Australian women
Medallists at the 2018 Commonwealth Games